The 2018 Melbourne Darts Masters was the second staging of the tournament by the Professional Darts Corporation, as a fifth entry in the 2018 World Series of Darts. The tournament featured 16 players (eight PDC players facing eight regional qualifiers) and was held at the Hisense Arena in Melbourne from 10–12 August 2018.

Phil Taylor was the defending champion, defeating Peter Wright 11–8 in the 2017 final; however this would be Taylor's last televised title due to his retirement after the 2018 World Championship.

Wright avenged his defeat from the last tournament by winning his second World Series title after beating Michael Smith 11–8 in the final.

Prize money
The total prize fund was £60,000.

Qualifiers
The eight invited PDC representatives, (seeded according to the 2018 World Series of Darts Order of Merit) are:

  Michael van Gerwen (semi-finals)
  Rob Cross (quarter-finals)
  Gary Anderson (semi-finals)
  Peter Wright (champion)
  Michael Smith (runner-up)
  Raymond van Barneveld (quarter-finals)
  Simon Whitlock (quarter-finals)
  Kyle Anderson (first round)

The regional qualifiers are:

Draw

References

Melbourne Darts Masters
Melbourne Darts Masters
World Series of Darts
Sports competitions in Melbourne
Melbourne Darts Masters